UOJ may refer to: 

 University of Jaffna, in Jaffna, Sri Lanka
 University of Jinan, in Jinan, China